Paola Loreti is an Italian mathematician, and a professor of mathematical analysis at Sapienza University of Rome.
She is known for her research on Fourier analysis, control theory, and non-integer representations. The Komornik–Loreti constant, the smallest non-integer base for which the representation of 1 is unique, is named after her and Vilmos Komornik.

Loreti earned a laurea from Sapienza University in 1984. Her dissertation, Programmazione dinamica ed equazione di Bellman [dynamic programming and the Bellman equation] was supervised by Italo Capuzzo-Dolcetta.

With Vilmos Komornik, Loreti is the author of the book Fourier Series in Control Theory (Springer, 2005).

References

External links
Home page

Year of birth missing (living people)
Living people
Italian mathematicians
Women mathematicians
Sapienza University of Rome alumni
Academic staff of the Sapienza University of Rome
Mathematical analysts
Control theorists